, also romanized as Tempuku, was a  after Jōei and before Bunryaku. This period spanned the years from April 1233 to November 1234.

Change of era
 1233 :  The era name was changed to mark an event or a number of events. The previous era ended and a new one commenced in Jōei 2.

Events of the Tenpuku Era
 1233 (Tenpuku 1, 1st month):  Kujō Yoritsune is granted the court post of provisional

Notes

References
 Nussbaum, Louis-Frédéric and Käthe Roth. (2005).  Japan encyclopedia. Cambridge: Harvard University Press. ;  OCLC 58053128
 Titsingh, Isaac. (1834). Nihon Odai Ichiran; ou,  Annales des empereurs du Japon.  Paris: Royal Asiatic Society, Oriental Translation Fund of Great Britain and Ireland. OCLC 5850691
 Varley, H. Paul. (1980). A Chronicle of Gods and Sovereigns: Jinnō Shōtōki of Kitabatake Chikafusa. New York: Columbia University Press. ;  OCLC 6042764

External links
 National Diet Library, "The Japanese Calendar" -- historical overview plus illustrative images from library's collection

Japanese eras
1230s in Japan